That Texas Jamboree is a 1946 American Western film directed by Ray Nazarro and written by J. Benton Cheney. The film stars Ken Curtis, Jeff Donnell, Andy Clyde, Guinn "Big Boy" Williams, and Robert Kellard. The film was released on May 16, 1946, by Columbia Pictures.

Plot

Cast

References

External links
 

1946 films
1940s English-language films
American Western (genre) films
1946 Western (genre) films
Columbia Pictures films
Films directed by Ray Nazarro
American black-and-white films
1940s American films